The Karlovy Vary Half Marathon is an annual half marathon race which takes place in mid May in Karlovy Vary, Czech Republic. Known as the Mattoni Karlovy Vary Half Marathon, it is a part of RunCzech running circuit.

The course winds through Karlovy Vary city centre and along the Ohře river. The inaugural edition of the event was held in 2013. In 2017, almost 4 000 runners participated in the race.

The course records are held by Wilfred Kimitei and Yvonne Jelagat.

Past winners
Key:

References

External links

 Karlovy Vary Half Marathon official website

Sport in Karlovy Vary
Half marathons
Athletics competitions in the Czech Republic
Recurring sporting events established in 2012
Summer events in the Czech Republic